Solved na Solved (English: Solved to Solved) is a Philippine reality-talk show broadcast on TV5 and premiered on January 19, 2015, replacing Movie Max 5. It is hosted by Gelli de Belen, Arnell Ignacio and Atty. Mel Sta. Maria. It airs every Monday to Friday at 11:15am (PST) after Healing Galing sa TV and before Aksyon sa Tanghali.

On April 6, 2015, the program will change its schedule every Tuesday to Thursday, and its 2nd Season but on April 16, the show went off air.

The show ended on April 16, 2015.

Hosts
 Gelli de Belen
 Arnell Ignacio
 Atty. Mel Sta. Maria

See also 
 List of programs aired by TV5 (Philippine TV network)
 Face to Face
 Face the People

References

External links 
 

TV5 (Philippine TV network) original programming
Philippine reality television series
Philippine television talk shows
2015 Philippine television series debuts
2015 Philippine television series endings
Filipino-language television shows